Netilmicin (1-N-ethylsisomicin) is a semisynthetic aminoglycoside antibiotic, and a derivative of sisomicin, produced by Micromonospora inyoensis. Aminoglycoside antibiotics have the ability to kill a wide variety of bacteria. Netilmicin is not absorbed from the gut and is therefore only given by injection or infusion. It is only used in the treatment of serious infections particularly those resistant to gentamicin.

It was patented in 1973 and approved for medical use in 1981. It was approved for medical use in the UK in December 2019, for the treatment of external infections of the eye. It is on the World Health Organization's List of Essential Medicines.


Comparison with drugs 
According to the British National Formulary (BNF), netilmicin has similar activity to gentamicin, but less ototoxicity in those needing treatment for longer than 10 days.  Netilmicin is active against a number of gentamicin-resistant Gram-negative bacteria but is less active against Pseudomonas aeruginosa than gentamicin or tobramycin.

However, according to the below-mentioned studies, the above advantages are controversial:Netilmicin (Netromycin, Schering-Plough, Netspan- Cipla): In summary, netilmicin has not been demonstrated to have significant advantages over other aminoglycosides (gentamicin, tobramycin, amikacin), and it is more expensive; thus, its potential value is limited.  Drug Intelligence & Clinical Pharmacy: Vol. 17, No. 2, pp. 83-91.Once-daily gentamicin versus once-daily netilmicin in patients with serious infections—a randomized clinical trial: We conclude that with once-daily dosing no benefit of netilmicin over gentamicin regarding nephro- or ototoxicity could be demonstrated. Journal of Antimicrobial Chemotherapy (1994) 33, 823-835.Ototoxicity and nephrotoxicity of gentamicin vs netilmicin in patients with serious infections. A randomized clinical trial: We conclude that with once-daily treatment no benefit of netilmicin over gentamicin regarding nephro- or ototoxicity could be demonstrated. Clin Otolaryngol Allied Sci. 1995 Apr;20(2):118-23.Relative efficacy and toxicity of netilmicin and tobramycin in oncology patients: We conclude that aminoglycoside-associated ototoxicity was less severe and more often reversible with netilmicin than with tobramycin. Arch Intern Med. 1986 Dec;146(12):2329-34.  Daily single-dose aminoglycoside administration. Therapeutic and economic benefits: Animal studies have shown that dosing aminoglycosides once daily is more efficient and less nephrotoxic than the conventional multiple daily dosing regimens. Netilmicin and amikacin are the drugs most often used in clinical trials of once-daily dosing regimens. Ugeskrift for Lægerer. 1993 May 10;155(19):1436-41.Comparison of Netilmicin with Gentamicin in the Therapy of Experimental Escherichia coli Meningitis: Because of its reduced toxicity and greater in vivo bactericidal activity, netilmicin may offer an advantage over gentamicin in the therapy of gram-negative bacillary meningitis. Antimicrob Agents Chemother. 1978 June; 13(6): 899-904.A comparison of netilmicin and gentamicin in the treatment of pelvic infections: The microbacteria isolated by standard culture techniques before therapy revealed Neisseria gonorrhoeae in 69% and 51% of the netilmicin and gentamicin groups, respectively; anaerobic organisms were cultured in about 75% of each group. Obstetrics & Gynecology 1979;54:554-557.Netilmicin: a review of toxicity in laboratory animals: Presently available data suggest that netilmicin offers distinct advantages over older aminoglycosides. Final conclusions must await prospective randomized double-blind trials in man. J Int Med Res. 1978;6(4):286-99.Nonparallel nephrotoxicity dose-response curves of aminoglycosides: Nephrotoxicity comparisons of aminoglycosides in rats, utilizing large multiples of human doses, have indicated an advantage for netilmicin. However, no nephrotoxicity advantage of netilmicin has been demonstrated at the lower doses used in clinics. Antimicrob Agents Chemother. 1981 June; 19(6): 1024–1028.Comparative ototoxicity of netilmicin, gentamicin, and tobramycin in cats: Under the conditions of this study, at least a twofold (vestibular) to fourfold (cochlear) relative safety margin for ototoxicity was established in favor of netilmicin over tobramycin and gentamicin. Toxicol Appl Pharmacol. 1985 Mar 15;77(3):479-89.Comparison of Netilmicin and Gentamicin Pharmacokinetics in Humans: In a crossover study, single doses of netilmicin and gentamicin were administered intramuscularly, each at 1.0 and 2.5 mg/kg. No significant differences were observed between the two drugs in disposition half-life, rate of distribution and elimination, area under the serum concentration-time curve, urinary excretion, total body clearance, and renal clearance. Antimicrobial Agents and Chemotherapy, Feb. 1980, p. 184-187. Schering-Plough Research Division, Bloomfield, New Jersey 07003''.

References

External links 
 

Aminoglycoside antibiotics
Micromonosporaceae